In software engineering, Business Object Notation (BON) is a method and graphical notation for high-level object-oriented analysis and design.

The method was developed between 1989 and 1993 by Jean-Marc Nerson and Kim Waldén as a means of extending the higher-level concepts of the Eiffel programming language. It claims to be much simpler than its competition - the Unified Modeling Language (UML) - but it didn't enjoy its commercial success.

See also 
 Business object

External links
 BON method website
 Book about BON, as PDF
 An Introduction to BON
 Tool supporting BON (integrated into Eiffel IDE)

Data modeling diagrams